RBS Express railroad trains were 3 mobile United States Air Force radar stations for 1CEVG Radar Bomb Scoring (RBS) of Strategic Air Command bomber crews beginning in March 1961.  Electronic equipment included the "MSQ-39, TLQ-11, MPS-9, and the IFF/SIF for the MSQ-39" along with support railcars ("work train"), and the trains were temporarily used at various rail sites (e.g., sidings) with the radar antennas emplaced using hoists built onto flatcars.  Pulled by a "contracted locomotive" that left the train at the site (e.g., for 45 days), and a North American B-25 Mitchell was used for calibration of the radar station.

Each train used "existing U.S. Army stock" from Ogden General Depot, and each train's 21 cars (17 support and 4 radar cars) included "a generator car, two box cars (one for radar equipment maintenance, and one for support maintenance) [a] dining car, two day-room cars, supply cars, admin car, and 4 [crew sleeping cars]."  Depot maintenance for the trains was at the Tooele Army Depot southwest of Salt Lake City ("Army Rail Shops").  Major Eugene R. Butler was the 1st commander of the "First RBS Express", and each 1CEVG squadron's detachments manned a train (after the 1965 discontinuation of RBS squadrons, RBS detachments continued operating trains.)  Butler's command had 60 11th RBS airmen: 15 from the Joplin Bomb Plot and others from the bomb plots at La Junta CO, Bismarck ND, Minneapolis MN, Salt Lake City UT, St Louis MO, and Little Rock AR.

References

Cold War military history of the United States
Electronic warfare
Strategic Air Command
Railway weapons